Mechanics' Hall was a meeting hall and theatre seating 2,500 people located at 472 Broadway in New York City, United States. It had a brown façade. Built by the Mechanics' Society for their monthly meetings in 1847, it was also used for banquets, luncheons, and speeches held by other groups.

The building eventually became a playhouse. During this time, it was variously known as the Abbey Theatre, Butler's American Theatre, and other names. The blackface minstrel troupe Buckley's Serenaders saw great success there until 1846. Christy's Minstrels became the resident minstrel company in February 1847, buying the building later in 1847. They remained until July 1854, when the troupe disbanded. Bryants Minstrels played at Mechanics' Hall for the first time in 1857, leaving after May, 1866, when the house was taken over for a season by minstrel showman Charles "Charlie" White.

In 1867, showman Robert Butler took over management of Mechanics' Hall following a fire that destroyed his former theater at 444 Broadway. Butler's luck was no better in the new venue as Mechanics' Hall was also destroyed by fire later that year.

References

 Crawford, Richard (2001). America's Musical Life: A History. New York: W. W. Norton & Company, Inc.
 Henderson, Mary C. (2004). The City & The Theatre: The History of New York Playhouses: A 250 Year Journey from Bowling Green to Times Square. New York: Back Stage Books.
Mahar, William J. (1999). Behind the Burnt Cork Mask: Early Blackface Minstrelsy and Antebellum American Popular Culture. Chicago: University of Illinois Press.
 Rock, Howard B. (1989). The New York City Artisan, 1789–1825: A Documentary History. State University of New York.
 Sweetster, M. F. (1883). New England: A Handbook for Travellers. A Guide to the Chief Cities and Popular Resorts of New England, and to Its Scenery and Historic Attractions: With the Western and Northern Borders, from New York to Quebec. 7 ed. Boston: James R. Osgood & Co.

External links

Commercial buildings completed in 1847
1847 establishments in New York (state)
Demolished buildings and structures in Manhattan
Cultural history of New York City
Former theatres in Manhattan
Broadway (Manhattan)
Buildings and structures demolished in 1868